Ho Pui is a village in Pat Heung, Yuen Long District, Hong Kong.

Administration
Ho Pui is a recognized village under the New Territories Small House Policy.

See also
 Ho Pui Reservoir
 Ma On Kong and Tai Kek, two nearby villages

References

External links

 Delineation of area of existing village Ho Pui Tsuen (Pat Heung) for election of resident representative (2019 to 2022)
 Antiquities Advisory Board. Historic Building Appraisal. Fan Ancestral Hall, Ho Pui Tsuen Pictures
 Antiquities Advisory Board. Historic Building Appraisal. On Ding Sai Kui, Ho Pui Tsuen Pictures
 Organic farm at Ho Pui Tsuen on Film Services Office website
 Pictures of Ho Pui

Villages in Yuen Long District, Hong Kong
Pat Heung